Laughing Bird Caye is an island off the coast of Placencia, Belize. On 21 December 1991, Laughing Bird Caye National Park was declared. The island is named after a population of laughing gulls which previously bred there.

Location 
It is 3.5 miles south southwest of Moho Caye and 7 miles north northwest of Ranguana Caye. The precise GPS coordinates of the island are 16°26'36" North latitude and 88°11'50" West longitude. Laughing Bird Caye is also the southernmost island in the central lagoon of the Belize Barrier Reef.

Geography 
Laughing Bird Caye is a long island that sits on an unusually long narrow ridge of reef called a faro. A faro is an angular atoll on a continental shelf, which is also called a shelf atoll. Similar to other atolls, a faro has a steep drop off and has a central lagoon enclosed in the reef. This Laughing Bird Faro is separated from the mainland and the barrier reef by deep channels all around.

History 
This island is referred to as Laughing Bird Caye from the Laughing gull or Larus artricilla. It was named after this bird because they used to breed on the island. However, due to an increase in human activity on the island the Laughing Gulls have moved to other islands that are more deserted and less affected by human presence. The uniqueness of the island, the faro, and the abundant diversity of coral and marine habitats led to the Caye being declared as a protected area in 1981 under the National Park Systems Act. Subsequently, Laughing Bird Caye was declared a national park in 1991. The Belize Barrier Reef Reserve System was then registered on the World Heritage List in 1996 with The Laughing Bird National Park designated as one of the premiere protected areas within the World Heritage Site.

References

 http://www.laughingbird.org/park1.html
 http://ambergriscaye.com/pages/town/parklaughbird.html
 http://seabelize.org/protected-areas/laughing-bird-caye-national-park/

External links

National parks of Belize
Islands of Belize
Protected areas established in 1991
Stann Creek District
1991 establishments in Belize
Uninhabited islands of Belize
Caribbean Sea